Moths Games is a 2004 Russian drama film directed by Andrey Proshkin.

Plot 
The film tells about a young rock musician who is invited to the capital to take part in the final of a television music competition. In the wake of euphoria on the eve of departure, he, along with friends, steals someone else's car. Suddenly a tragedy happened: they shot down a man.

Cast 
 Aleksey Chadov as Kostya
 Mariya Zvonaryova as Liza
 Oksana Akinshina as Zoyka
 Yuriy Kuznetsov as Stepanych
 Andrey Smolyakov as Glebov
 Aleksey Shevchenkov as Kupriyanov
 Darya Ekamasova as Chicha
 Polina Golovina as Alka
 Yuliya Lomakina as Mashka
 Sergey Shnurov as John
 Sergei Frolov as Kaban
 Arkady Ukupnik as cameo

References

External links 
 

2004 films
2000s Russian-language films
Russian drama films
2004 drama films
Films based on Russian novels
Russian rock music films